Jonatan Grahn (born 15 October 2000) is a speedway rider from Sweden.

Speedway career 
Grahn came to prominence in 2020, when he reached the final and finished fifth in the 2020 Individual Speedway Junior European Championship. The following year in 2021, he represented Sweden in the Team Speedway Junior World Championship final.

In 2022, he recorded a fourth place finish in Team Junior European Championship and rode for Indianerna in the Swedish Eliserien (the highest league in Sweden).

Family
His younger brother Gustav Grahn is also a professional speedway rider.

References 

Living people
2000 births
Swedish speedway riders